Ballygunge Junction railway station is a Kolkata Suburban Railway junction station on the Main line with an approximate  distance from the Sealdah railway station. It is under the jurisdiction of the Eastern Railway zone of Indian Railways. Ballygunge Junction railway station is one of the busiest railway stations in the Sealdah railway division. More than 150 pairs of EMU local trains pass through the railway station on a daily basis. It is situated in Ballygunge, Kolkata in the Indian state of West Bengal. Ballygunge Junction railway station serves Ballygunge and the surrounding areas.

Geography

History

Electrification

Station complex
The platform is well sheltered. The station possesses many facilities including water and sanitation. It is well connected to the SH-1. There is a proper approach road to this station.

References

Railway junction stations in West Bengal
Railway stations in Kolkata
Sealdah railway division
Kolkata Suburban Railway stations
Kolkata Circular Railway
Railway stations opened in 1862
1862 establishments in India
1862 establishments in the British Empire